= Chamail =

Muslim community in Bihar, India

The Chamail are a Muslim community, found in the state of Bihar, India.
